Szymon Woźniak (born 6 May 1993) is a Polish speedway rider.

Career
He rode for his hometown club, Polonia Bydgoszcz in the Speedway Ekstraliga up to 2015 before moving to Sparta Wrocław for the 2016 season. He rode for the Poland U-21 national team and won the Polish Under-21 Championship in 2014. He was part of the Leicester Lions team in the British Elite League in 2015 and 2016.

In 2017 he won the Polish Championship, beating Przemyslaw Pawlicki, Patryk Dudek, and Jaroslaw Hampel in the final.

Personal life 
Woźniak has one older brother. His family is unrelated to Jacek Woźniak, a Polonia Bydgoszcz coach.

Career details

World Championships 
 Individual U-21 World Championship
 2010 - not classified (did not ride in the Final One)
 Team U-21 World Championship
 2010 -  Rye House - 3rd

European Championships 
 Individual U-19 European Championship
 2010 - lost in the domestic qualification

Domestic competitions 
 Polish Under-21 Championship
 2009 - Leszno - 10th place (7 pts)
 2014 - Gorzow - 1st place (14 pts)
 Polish Silver Helmet (U-21):
 2009 - lost in the Semi-Final Two
 2010 - Bydgoszcz - 6th place (9 pts)
 Polish Bronze Helmet (U-19)
 2009 -  Wrocław - 16th place (0 pts)
 2010 -  Leszno - 8th place (8 pts)
 Polish Championship
 2017 - Gorzow - 1st place

See also 

 Speedway in Poland

References 

1993 births
Living people
Polish speedway riders
Polonia Bydgoszcz riders
Leicester Lions riders
People from Tuchola